In the early morning hours of April 4, 1981, an unusual and deadly anticyclonic F4 tornado struck West Bend, Wisconsin. It killed three people, and injured another 53. The tornado was largely unexpected and the storm that produced it did not display features of a typical severe storm. Because of this, the National Weather Service issued only a Severe Thunderstorm Warning prior to the tornado, causing local law enforcement to not sound the tornado sirens in time for residents to take shelter.

Meteorological synopsis
During the early morning on April 4, 1981, meteorological conditions in Wisconsin were conducive for severe weather. At around 12:00am CST (0600 UTC) a thunderstorm developed and rapidly began to grow over south central Wisconsin. The growing storm caused a downburst near the village of Clyman and then continued on towards West Bend. The storm however did not appear to be severe, thunderstorm tops were measured to only be  and a weak bow echo was observed by a radar in Neenah. Only a few minutes after midnight (local time), while the storm was weakening the tornado touched down. The tornado was extremely narrow, but it still managed to produce F3 and F4 damage only a few seconds after touching down. It cut a swath of destruction through the city, killing several and injuring many more. Post storm analysis determined that not only was the tornado an extremely rare occurrence given the storm's strength, but also that it was an anticyclonic tornado. The F4 tornado is the only violent and the strongest anticyclonic tornado ever recorded.

Impact
The West Bend tornado killed three people and injured another 53. It was the most intense tornado to strike Wisconsin in 1981, and caused $25.0 million in damages. Following the tornado the American Red Cross determined that around 139 structures were damaged or destroyed by the storm. With many residents left homeless and the threat of more storms looming, Governor Lee S. Dreyfus declared a state of emergency freeing up the area for aid. The campus of the Moraine Park Technical Institute was severely damaged by the tornado and classes were disrupted.

Aftermath
It was determined that the West Bend police did not activate the city's siren system before or during the tornado. The National Weather Service in Milwaukee issued a Severe Thunderstorm Warning for the area that only mentioned a confirmed tornado touchdown. However, because no Tornado Warning was issued for the storm, local police failed to activate the siren. Nearby Dodge County did activate their siren system after damage reports. The tornado showed the problems with operational meteorology or "nowcasting". The storm did not display the typical features of a severe storm and the tornado that was produced formed while the storm was weakening, an almost unheard of event.

See also
List of North American tornadoes and tornado outbreaks
Anticyclonic tornado
1996 Oakfield tornado outbreak

References

External links
University of Chicago Event Report

F4 tornadoes by date
West Bend,1981-04-04
Tornadoes of 1981
Tornadoes in Wisconsin
Washington County, Wisconsin
1981 natural disasters in the United States
West Bend tornado